Green Deal may refer to:
 Balkan Green Deal BW, is a project within the framework of the Danube Strategy of the European Union under the leadership of the University of Hohenheim 
 European Green Deal, set of policy initiatives brought forward by the European Commission with the overarching aim of making Europe climate neutral in 2050
 Green New Deal, proposed package of United States legislation that aims to address climate change and economic inequality
 A Green New Deal, report released in the United Kingdom on 21 July 2008 by the Green New Deal Group and published by the New Economics Foundation, which outlines a series of policy proposals to tackle global warming, the current financial crisis, and peak oil
 The Green Deal, UK government policy initiative that gave homeowners, landlords and tenants the opportunity to pay for energy efficient home improvements through the savings on their energy bills